Stephen Lanza (born May 10, 1957) is a retired United States Army lieutenant general who served as commanding general, I Corps at Joint Base Lewis–McChord from February 6, 2014 to April 3, 2017, when he transferred authority to Lieutenant General Gary J. Volesky. He retired from active service on June 2, 2017.

Early life and education
Lanza was commissioned into the Field Artillery in 1980, after graduating from the United States Military Academy at West Point. He is a graduate of the United States Army Command and General Staff College and the School for Advanced Military Studies at Fort Leavenworth, Kansas. He has a bachelor of science degree from the United States Military Academy, a Master of Science in Administration from Central Michigan University and a Master of Science in National Security and Strategic Studies from the National War College at Fort Lesley J. McNair, Washington D.C. He has also served as a National Security Fellow at Massachusetts Institute of Technology, Cambridge, Massachusetts.

Military career
Lanza has commanded soldiers at all levels including the 7th Infantry Division; 5th Brigade Combat Team, 1st Cavalry Division, Fort Hood, Texas and Operation Iraqi Freedom, Iraq; and the 1st Battalion, 5th Field Artillery, 1st Infantry Division, Fort Riley, Kansas.

Lanza's senior staff assignments include the aide-de-camp to the Commander in Chief, United States Army Europe/Commander, NATO Peace Stabilization Force; Concepts Team Chief for the Office of the Deputy Chief of Staff for Operations, G3, Pentagon; Chief, Joint Capabilities Division, J8, the Joint Staff, Pentagon; Deputy Commanding General for V Corps, U.S. Army Europe and Seventh Army, Germany; G3, Chief of Operations, U.S. Army Europe and Seventh Army, Germany; J9, Director for Strategic Effects, Multi-National Forces-Iraq (MNF-I), Iraq; Spokesman, United States Force-Iraq (USF-I), Iraq; and the Army's Chief of Public Affairs for the Secretary of the Army, Washington D.C.  His operational deployment experience includes Operations Desert Shield and Desert Storm, Saudi Arabia; Operation Joint Guard, Bosnia-Herzegovina; Operation Iraqi Freedom, Iraq; and Operation New Dawn, Iraq.

Awards and Recognitions

References

1957 births
Living people
Place of birth missing (living people)
United States Military Academy alumni
Central Michigan University alumni
National War College alumni
United States Army personnel of the Gulf War
United States Army personnel of the Iraq War
Recipients of the Defense Superior Service Medal
Recipients of the Distinguished Service Medal (US Army)
Recipients of the Legion of Merit
United States Army generals